Countess Yuliya Pavlovna Samoylova (Grafinya Yuliya Pavlovna Samoylova, née Yuliya von der Pahlen; 1803—March 14, 1875) was a granddaughter of Count Martyn Skavronskiy and the last scion of Skavronskiy family. She was born to Pavel von der Pahlen and Mariya Skavronskaya, but grew up in the house of Count Yuliy Litta due to early death of her mother. Samoylova became an owner of Grafskaya Slavyanka manor (now Antropshino), near Tsarskoye Selo and a holder of several masterpieces. On January 25, 1825 she married Count Nikolai Samoylov, but later divorced him as well as several other persons. Samoylova had strong affiliations with Karl Briullov, whose The Last Day of Pompeii among others shows the idealized figures of himself and Samoylova. In 1840 Samoylova sold Grafskaya Slavyanka and left Russia for Italy. She was buried at Père Lachaise Cemetery in Paris.

Footnotes

Yulia
1803 births
1875 deaths
Burials at Père Lachaise Cemetery
Emigrants from the Russian Empire to Italy